India has many official names, expressing its linguistic diversity. English and Hindi in the Devanagari script are the sole official languages of India as per Article 343 of the Constitution of India and there is no national language for the country. English in the Latin alphabet has the status of a "subsidiary official language" according to clause 3 of Official Languages Act, 1963. Hindi romanisation uses Hunterian transliteration, which is the "national system of romanisation in India" and the one officially used by the Government of India. The Eighth Schedule of the Indian Constitution lists 22 languages, which have been referred to as scheduled languages and given recognition, status, and official encouragement.

Hindi and English

Eighth Schedule languages 

Footnotes:

See also
 Names for India
 Bharat (disambiguation)

References

Toponyms for India
Languages of India
Official languages of India
Government of India
India-related lists
Part 17